The Eternal Woman is a 1929 American silent drama film directed by John P. McCarthy and starring Olive Borden, Ralph Graves and Ruth Clifford. The film is set in Argentina.

Cast
 Olive Borden as Anita 
 Ralph Graves as Hartley Forbes 
 Ruth Clifford as Doris Forbes 
 John Miljan as Gil Martin 
 Nina Quartero as Consuelo 
 Josef Swickard as Ovaldo 
 Julia Swayne Gordon as Mrs. Forbes

References

Bibliography
 Munden, Kenneth White. The American Film Institute Catalog of Motion Pictures Produced in the United States, Part 1. University of California Press, 1997.

External links

1929 films
1929 drama films
Silent American drama films
Films directed by John P. McCarthy
American silent feature films
1920s English-language films
American black-and-white films
Columbia Pictures films
Films set in Argentina
1920s American films